Alan Gilbert Merten (December 27, 1941 – May 21, 2020) was the fifth president of George Mason University.

Personal life
Merten was married to Sally Merten, and they had two children and four grandsons. Merten died on May 21, 2020 at a nursing home in Naples, Florida after a battle with Parkinson’s disease.

Education
Merten received an undergraduate degree in mathematics at the University of Wisconsin–Madison, a masters in Computer science from Stanford University, and a PhD in Computer Science at the University of Wisconsin–Madison.

Career
Merten began his academic career as an engineering professor at the University of Michigan. Later he deaned the College of Business Administration at the University of Florida. Next he served as the dean of the Samuel Curtis Johnson Graduate School of Management at Cornell University. Merten joined George Mason University as president in 1996 and retired on June 30, 2012.

References

External links

People from Milwaukee
 University of Wisconsin–Madison College of Letters and Science alumni
Stanford University alumni
University of Michigan faculty
University of Florida faculty
Cornell University faculty
Presidents of George Mason University
1941 births
2020 deaths